The 2019–2021 Jammu and Kashmir lockdown was a preventive security lockdown and communications blackout that had been imposed throughout the Indian-administered union territory of Jammu and Kashmir following the revocation of Article 370 which lasted until February 2021, with the goal of preemptively curbing unrest, violence and protests. Most separatist leaders had and have been detained in the crackdown. The Indian government had stated that the tough lockdown measures and substantially increased deployment of security forces had been aimed at curbing terrorism. The government did not want a repeat of the death and injuries seen during the 2016–2017 Kashmir unrest.

The revocation and subsequent lockdown drew condemnation from several countries, especially Pakistan, which had lodged protests with India on multiple occasions.

On 5 February 2021 Jammu and Kashmir's Principal Secretary of Power and Information announced that 4G internet services would be restored in the entire union territory. Subsequently, the ban of 4G and 3G services ended.

Timeline 
The lockdown officially started on 5 August 2019, following the revocation of the special status of Jammu and Kashmir via the scrapping of Article 370 and Article 35A of the Indian constitution and subsequent introduction of the Jammu and Kashmir Reorganisation Act, 2019. Since the lockdown was brought into effect, no foreign journalist has been allowed by the Indian government to report from the new union territory of Jammu and Kashmir.

According to a 6 September 2019 report by the Indian government, nearly 4,000 people have been arrested in the disputed region. Among those arrested were more than 200 local Kashmiri politicians, including two former chief ministers of the state of Jammu and Kashmir, along with more than 100 leaders and activists from the All Parties Hurriyat Conference.

On 1 October 2019, a three-judge bench consisting of justices N. V. Ramana, Ramayyagari Subhash Reddy and Bhushan Ramkrishna Gavai of the Supreme Court of India, heard the appeal of seven petitions on the lockdown.

On 4 October 2019, the Indian government denied United States Senator Chris Van Hollen's request to travel to Jammu and Kashmir. Meanwhile, Sandeep Pandey, an education reformer, and other activists who were on an informal fact-finding mission were also barred from leaving the airport in Srinagar. On the same day, protests were held by the local Kashmiri people, where they chanted pro-Pakistan slogans and demanded an end to what they described as the "Indian occupation of their territory".

On 24 October 2019, village council elections were held across Jammu and Kashmir, despite a boycott by most political parties and the detention of many mainstream local politicians; political scientist Noor Ahmed Baba called it "more like an artificial exercise".

Mobile phone services were barred for the 85th consecutive day on 28 October, for at least 2.5 million prepaid cell phone users in Jammu and Kashmir. In January 2020, a 2G internet connection was established in Jammu & Kashmir, albeit only for limited whitelisted sites approved by the Indian government. Social Media was completely banned. Some Security force personnel used to check  mobile phones of the local Kashmiris to see any social media access using VPN. 

A new curfew was imposed a day ahead of the first anniversary of India's decision to revoke the disputed region's semi-autonomy, on 4 August 2020. Officials announced a two-day "full curfew" citing intelligence reports of looming protests in the Muslim-majority region, where locals have called for the anniversary to be marked as a "black day".

On 16 August 2020, 4G LTE mobile services were restored in two districts of the union territory of Jammu and Kashmir on a trial basis, after the Supreme Court of India ruled that an indefinite shutdown was effectively illegal.

At least 75 Kashmiri leaders and activists were pre-emptively arrested in December 2020 to limit political unrest after a number of opposition political parties won elections in Jammu and Kashmir.

On 5 February 2021, Jammu and Kashmir's Principal Secretary of Power and Information, Rohit Kansal, announced that 4G internet services would be restored in the entire union territory. This was applauded by the union territory former Chief Ministers Omar Abdullah and Farooq Abdullah. The move was lauded by Jammu and Kashmir Apni Party president Altaf Bukhari and Srinagar Mayor Junaid Azim Mattu.

On September 2, security forces imposed a new lockdown and restriction on communications until 4 September 2021, following the death of Syed Ali Shah Geelani, a top Kashmiri separatist leader. In flak jackets and riot gear, armed police and paramilitary personnel patrolled the streets in Srinagar on 4 September 2021 and ordered residents to stay indoors. Razor wire, steel barricades, and armored vehicles blocked some streets. The situation in Srinagar and Budgam returned to normal by 7 September.

Re-introduction of tourism and recovery

Tourism 
In October 2019, the Indian government planned to re-introduce tourism in the union territory of Jammu and Kashmir and lift security restrictions for all foreigners visiting the region, although they would still be prevented from using mobile internet or cellphones. 2G mobile services were restored in January 2020, while 4G services in Ganderbal and Udhampur were restarted in August 2020. 4G mobile Internet services were fully restored across Jammu and Kashmir in February 2021. In the wake of Syed Ali Shah Geelani's death, a new preemptive blackout was done in early September 2021, which ended completely on 7 September 2021.

Figures show 19,000 tourists visited the Union Territory in January 2021, compared to only 3,750 tourists that visited Srinagar in January 2020. In August 2021, Srinagar Airport reported over 8000 passengers in one day. Kuldeep Singh (Director of Srinagar Airport) revealed that out of 72 major airports in India, Srinagar International Airport had become the first to surpass pre Covid passenger arrivals in August 2021. The director stated, "On Friday alone at Srinagar airport, 8515 passengers traveled on 74 flights to and fro and within this month, we are expecting it will cross above 10000."

In July 2021, a total of around 10.5 lakh (1.05 million) tourists visited Jammu and Kashmir, and rose to 11.22 lakh (1.122 million) tourists in August 2021.

Economic recovery 
In 2021, the government of Jammu and Kashmir launched an industrial policy. By mid August Rs 23,000 crore (230 billion INR) worth of investment proposals were cleared by the J&K Government, of which 12,000 crore was in Jammu Division and 11,000 crore in Kashmir Division. Investment proposals rose to Rs 25,000 crore (250 billion INR) by early September, with investments in Jammu Division rising to 12,800 crore and Kashmir Division to 12,200 crore.

International reactions
 –President Donald Trump volunteered to serve as a mediator for the Kashmir dispute between India and Pakistan, but only if both countries accepted his offer. Alice Wells, the Assistant Secretary of State for South and Central Asian Affairs, said in a statement that the U.S. hoped "to see rapid action – the lifting of the restrictions and the release of those who have been detained". She added that the U.S. was "concerned by widespread detentions, including those of politicians and business leaders, and the restrictions on the residents of Jammu and Kashmir".
 – Pakistan reacted with extreme alarm to the revocation of Jammu and Kashmir's special status and subsequent lockdown, in what it viewed as the unilateral annexation of an internationally disputed region. Pakistani officials said that the country would "downgrade" diplomatic ties with India, dismiss the Indian High Commissioner to Pakistan, and halt bilateral trade with New Delhi. The Indian government's actions were met with outrage by the Pakistani people, who held nationwide protests against the "illegal Indian military occupation" and in solidarity with the Kashmiri people, with the Government of Pakistan subsequently designating 5 August to be observed as the Youm-e-Istehsal annually.
 – the UAE ambassador to India, Dr. Al Banna  said that his country had acknowledged the latest events in Jammu and Kashmir. He stated that this restructuring was not an unprecedented occurrence in the history of India and that the decision was intended to decrease regional inequality and enhance operational efficiency for the Indian government. He labelled India's latest decision in Jammu and Kashmir to be its internal issue.
 – The United Nations' special rapporteur on freedom of expression, David Kaye, said in a statement that "there's something about this shutdown that is draconian in a way other shutdowns usually are not". Secretary-General Antonio Guterres raised concern over the new limitations placed on Indian-administered Jammu and Kashmir, adding that the latest events "could exacerbate the human rights situation in the region". He urged Pakistan and India to exercise restraint with each other and to engage in bilateral dialogue to de-escalate the already-sensitive situation. Michelle Bachelet, UN High Commissioner for Human Rights, raised concern regarding "the human rights of Kashmiris, including restrictions on internet communications and peaceful assembly, and the detention of local political leaders and activists" at the 42nd Session of the United Nations Human Rights Council.

See also
State of emergency in India
Human rights abuses in Jammu and Kashmir
India-Pakistan relations
Indo-Pakistani wars and conflicts
Kashmir conflict

References

2019 in India
2020 in India
Lockdown
Kashmir conflict
Lockdown